Orla Hardiman (BSc MB BCh BAO MD FRCPI FAAN) is an Irish consultant neurologist. She was appointed Professor of Neurology by Trinity College University of Dublin in 2014, where she heads the Academic Unit of Neurology, housed in Trinity Biomedical Sciences Institute.   She is a HRB Clinician Scientist and Consultant Neurologist at the National Neuroscience Center of Ireland at Beaumont Hospital, Dublin. She leads a team of 30 researchers focussing on clinical and translational aspects of amyotrophic lateral sclerosis and related neurodegenerations. Hardiman has become a prominent advocate for neurological patients in Ireland, and for patients within the Irish health system generally.  She is co-Founder of the Neurological Alliance of Ireland, and Doctors Alliance for Better Public Healthcare. In the past, she established the bi-annual Diaspora Meeting, a forum for Irish neurologists based overseas to present and discuss their research findings with neurologists working in Ireland.

Education and training

Undergraduate degree and early postgraduate training
Hardiman attended University College Dublin (UCD) as an undergraduate medical student.  She completed an intercalated BSc in physiology in 1980 and received her medical degree in 1983.
After graduation from UCD, Hardiman undertook a one-year internship at St. Vincent's University Hospital, Dublin. From 1984 to 1986, she trained as a senior house officer in neurology and neuropathology at St. Lawrence's Hospital, Dublin.

United States
In 1986, Hardiman began a three-year neurology residency under the Harvard Longwood Area Neurology Training Program at Brigham and Women's Hospital, Beth Israel Hospital and Children's Hospital Boston. In 1989, she undertook a two-year Clinical and Research Fellowship in Neuromuscular Diseases under Dr. Robert H. Brown Jr. at the Department of Neurology, Massachusetts General Hospital and Harvard Medical School.

Return to Ireland
Upon completion of her fellowship, Hardiman took up a position as a Newman Scholar at the Department of Physiology in UCD. In 1992, Hardiman obtained her medical doctorate (MD) from UCD.  She became a member of the Royal College of Physicians of Ireland in 1993 and became a fellow of the College in 2001. In 1993 she became director of the ALS and neuromuscular clinics at Beaumont Hospital.  In 1994 she was appointed as a tenured lecturer at the UCD Department of Physiology.  She was appointed to Beaumont Hospital as the 11th Consultant Neurologist in Ireland in 1996.  She held the position of  Director of Neurology at Beaumont Hospital from 2000 to 2007, and has once more held it from 2012 to date. She was appointed as a Health Research Board Clinician Scientist and Clinical Professor of Neurology at Trinity College Dublin (2007). Hardiman is former Dean (2011-2013) of the Irish Institute of Clinical Neuroscience. She is the only Irish-based fellow of the American Academy of Neurology.

Research
Hardiman is a Health Research Board clinician scientist. Her main research interests are amyotrophic lateral sclerosis (motor neurone disease) and related motor neuron degenerations, phenotype/genotype correlations, population genetics and clinical epidemiology. Along with RCSI research fellow Dr. Matt Greenway, Hardiman discovered angiogenin, a novel gene which may be responsible for motor neuron disease. The discovery led to the development of an international research programme with Harvard Medical School, institutes in the United Kingdom and researchers at RCSI. Since 2008 she has been the editor in chief of the field journal "Amyotrophic Lateral Sclerosis and Frontotemporal Degeneration" and with Colin P Doherty is Co-Editor of the textbook "Neurodegenerative Disorders".

Awards and honours
In 2004, Hardiman received the first Palatucci Advocacy Leader of the Year Award from the American Academy of Neurology. The selection committee commended her "tireless advocacy efforts on behalf of the neurology profession and patients" in Ireland.
In 2009, she was awarded the Sheila Essey Award for ALS research by the American Academy of Neurology and the American ALS Association. She is the only Irish based neurologist to have received these awards from the American Academy of Neurology. In 2011 she received the Forbes Norris Award from the International Alliance of ALS/MND. The Award is to encourage a combination of two major qualities, management of and research into the disease to the benefit of people living with ALS/MND.

Patient advocacy
Hardiman has been an outspoken critic of clinics using stem cell therapy to treat neurological diseases, claiming it is "only at a very basic stage, even the animal experiments have not been proven", and comparing those offering the treatments to "19th century carpetbaggers".

In 2006, Hardiman told a Joint Oireachtas Committee on Health and Children that the Health Service Executive was doing a "bad job" in treating people with chronic diseases who had to access emergency departments. In 2014 in her role as co-founder and spokesperson for the Neurological Alliance of Ireland she welcomed steps from the Irish government to restore governmental funding for organizations which support people living with Alzheimer's disease, Huntington's disease, and motor neurone disease.

References

Living people
Irish neurologists
Year of birth missing (living people)
Members of the Royal College of Physicians of Ireland
Fellows of the Royal College of Physicians of Ireland
Fellows of the American Academy of Neurology